Park Kyung-suk (born 25 April 1981) is a South Korean handball player. At the 2012 Summer Olympics he competed with the South Korean national handball team in the men's tournament.

References

Living people
1981 births
Handball players at the 2012 Summer Olympics
Olympic handball players of South Korea
South Korean male handball players
Kyung Hee University alumni
Asian Games medalists in handball
Handball players at the 2006 Asian Games
Handball players at the 2010 Asian Games
Handball players at the 2014 Asian Games
Asian Games gold medalists for South Korea
Asian Games silver medalists for South Korea
Medalists at the 2010 Asian Games
Medalists at the 2014 Asian Games
21st-century South Korean people